Akbar Subhani is a Pakistani veteran actor of film and television. Known for his supporting roles, he is best recognized in PTV most acclaimed serials such as Sitara Aur Mehrunissa and Uncle Urfi and has worked in critically acclaimed films Josh: Independence Through Unity and Manto for which he received ARY Film Award for Best Actor in a Negative Role nomination at 2nd ARY Film Awards.

Filmography

Films
 Josh: Independence Through Unity 
 Manto
 Arifa
 Moor

Television
 Sitara Aur Mehrunissa
 Uncle Urfi
 Meharun Nisa
 Moorat
 Mahnoor
 Riyasat
 Sabz Qadam
 Dil-e-Nadaan
 Dhoop Main Sawan
 Shama
 Akhri Joint Family
 Uroos Paroos
 Hum Pe Jo Guzarti Hai
 Colony 52
 Rozi
 Bay Iman
 Muhabbat Kaun Rookay
 Kachra Kundi
 Perfume Chowk 
 Aitbaar
 Chaap Tayar Hai
 Ishq Zahe Naseeb
 Malaal E Yaar (Cameo Role)
 Tarap

Awards and nominations

 2nd Lux Style Awards - Rabiya Zinda Rahay Gi (nom)
 2nd ARY Film Awards - Manto (pending)

References

External links
 
 Akbar Subhani filmography

Male actors from Karachi
Living people
Muhajir people
Pakistani male television actors
Pakistani male film actors
Pakistani people of Yemeni descent
Year of birth missing (living people)